The Fred M. Hechinger Grand Prize for Distinguished Education Reporting is the United States' top annual prize for journalism about education. It has been awarded each year since 1972 by the Education Writers Association, the national group for reporters and editors who cover education issues. The Hechinger Prize is awarded to the top work of journalism among the first-place winners in the association's annual National Awards for Education Reporting.

It is named for Fred M. Hechinger, the longtime education editor of The New York Times.

List of winners

 1972: John Matthews, The Washington Star
 1973: William Grant, The Detroit Free Press
 1974: James Nolan and Linda Stahl, The Louisville Courier-Journal
 1975: Jonathan Neumann, Daily Hampshire Gazette (Northampton, Mass.)
 1976: James Worsham and Marguerite Del Guidice, The Boston Globe
 1977: Lou Antosh, The Philadelphia Bulletin
 1978: Stanley Moulton and Laurel Sorenson, Daily Hampshire Gazette
 1979: Staff of 10 writers, The Charlotte Observer
 1980: Rena W. Cohen, The Daily and Sunday Herald (Arlington Heights, Ill.)
 1981: Mary Bishop, Thomas Ferrick, Jr. and Donald Kimelman, The Philadelphia Inquirer
 1982: Fred Anklam and Nancy Weaver, The Clarion-Ledger
 1983: Robert Frahm, The Journal Times (Racine, Wisc.)
 1984: Cindy Goodaker, The Oakland Press
 1985: Janet Groat, The Macon Telegraph & Tribune
 1986: Ricardo Gandara, The Albuquerque Tribune
 1987: Emily Sachar, New York Newsday
 1988: Team of 14 reporters from The Chicago Tribune
 1989: Emily Sachar, New York Newsday
 1990: Ann Carnahan and Tony Pugh, The Rocky Mountain News
 1991: Theresa Churchill, Ron Ingram and Carol Alexander, The Herald & Review (Decatur, Ill.)
 1992: Kimberly J. McLarin, The Philadelphia Inquirer
 1993: Stephen Henderson, Lexington Herald-Leader
 1994: Neil A. Borowski, Laura Bruch, Thomas Ferrick, Craig McCoy, Dale Mezzacappa, John Woestenliek and Martha Woodall, The Philadelphia Inquirer
 1995: Dudley Althaus, The Houston Chronicle
 1996: Robert Frahm and Rick Green, The Hartford Courant
 1997: Jacques Steinberg, The New York Times
 1998: Deb Kollars, The Sacramento Bee
 1999: Tim Simmons, The News and Observer
 2000: Kenneth Weiss, the Los Angeles Times
 2001: Patrick Healy, The Boston Globe
 2002: Eric Eyre and Scott Finn, The Charleston Gazette
 2003: Christine Willmsen and Maureen O'Hagan, The Seattle Times
 2004: Joshua Benton, Holly Hacker and Herb Booth, The Dallas Morning News
 2005: Linda Lutton, Kati Phillips and Jonathan Lipman, The Daily Southtown
 2006: Jean Rimbach and Kathleen Carroll, The Bergen Record
 2007: Martha Irvine and Robert Tanner, Associated Press
 2008: Blake Morrison and Brad Heath, USA Today
 2009: Bob Hohler, Boston Globe, "Failing Our Athletes: The Sad State of Sports in Boston Public Schools"
 2010: Bloomberg News: "Education, Inc."
 2011: Daniel Golden and Oliver Staley, Bloomberg News
 2012: David Jackson and Gary Marx, Chicago Tribune
 2013: Alex Blumberg, Ben Calhoun, Ira Glass, Sarah Koening, Alex Kotlowitz, Linda Lutton, Miki Meek, Jonathan Menjivar, Lisa Pollak, Brian Reed, Robyn Semien, Alissa Shipp, Julie Snyder, and Nancy Updike of WBEZ (Chicago), This American Life
 2014: Nikole Hannah-Jones of ProPublica
 2015: Cara Fitzpatrick, Lisa Gartner and Michael LaForgia, Tampa Bay Times
 2016: Brian Rosenthal, Houston Chronicle
 2017: John Woodrow Cox, The Washington Post 
 2018: Hannah Dreier, ProPublica, New York and The New York Times Magazine
 2019: Jennifer Smith Richards of the Chicago Tribune, and Jodi S. Cohen and Lakeidra Chavis of ProPublica Illinois

References

American journalism awards
Awards established in 1972